Hoseynabad (also Romanized as Ḩoseynābād) is a village in Miyan Deh Rural District, Shibkaveh District, Fasa County, Fars Province, Iran. At the 2006 census, its population was 14, in 4 families.

References 

Populated places in Fasa County